"Lies" is a song performed by British DJ and producer Burns, released in the United Kingdom on 20 July 2012 as a digital download on iTunes. The song was written by Keir Gist, Alonzo Jackson, Taura Stinson, Laura Welsh, Matthew Burns and De'Andre Griffin. The song peaked at number 32 on the UK Singles Chart. This song uses a vocal sample of Deborah Cox's "It's Over Now".

Music video
A music video to accompany the release of "Lies" was first uploaded to Burns' Vevo account on 20 July 2012 at a total length of three minutes and twenty-four seconds. A second video, for the Otto Knows remix, was uploaded to his Vevo account on 26 November 2012.

Critical reception
Lucy Jones from NME gave the song a positive review, writing, "'Lies' casts Burns – a man previously known for being a bit like Calvin Harris – as a massive bangermonger in his own right. A catchy, pained vocal is pinned on a popping dancehall beat before a hands-in-the-air chorus with synths. Dancefloors will go bananas. Even Mr Burns would do the Macarena if he heard it."

Track listing

Charts

Release history

References

2012 singles
2012 songs
Burns (musician) songs
Songs written by KayGee
Songs written by Burns (musician)
Songs written by Taura Stinson